Gervais Poirot (4 March 1942 – 5 June 2008) was a French skier. He competed in the Nordic combined event at the 1968 Winter Olympics.

References

External links
 

1942 births
2008 deaths
French male Nordic combined skiers
Olympic Nordic combined skiers of France
Nordic combined skiers at the 1968 Winter Olympics
Sportspeople from Vosges (department)